Marta María Agüero García (born 9 November 1991) is a Paraguayan footballer who plays as a defender for Cerro Porteño and the Paraguay women's national team.

International career
Agüero capped for Paraguay during the 2010 South American Women's Football Championship.

Honours

Club
Sportivo Limpeño
Copa Libertadores Femenina: 2016

References

1991 births
Living people
Women's association football defenders
Paraguayan women's footballers
Paraguay women's international footballers
Cerro Porteño players
Paraguayan women's futsal players